Monty Waters (April 14, 1938 in Modesto, California – December 23, 2008 in Munich, Germany) was an American jazz saxophonist, flautist and singer.  Waters received his first musical training from his aunt and first played in the church. After his education in college, he was a member of a Rhythm & Blues band.  In the late 1950s he worked with musicians like BB King, Lightnin' Hopkins, Little Richard and James Brown on tour.  In San Francisco he played with King Pleasure and initiated in the early 1960s, a "Late Night Session" at the club Bop City. There he came into contact with musicians such as Miles Davis, John Coltrane, Art Blakey, Red Garland and Dexter Gordon, who visited this club after their concerts.  In addition, he and Pharoah Sanders, Dewey Redman and Donald Garrett formed a big band. In 1969 he moved to New York City and went with Jon Hendricks on a concert tour. During the 1970s he participated in the "Loft Jazz" scene.  Like many other jazz musicians, he moved in the 1980s to Paris, where he worked with Chet Baker, Pharoah Sanders and Johnny Griffin. Following Mal Waldron and Marty Cook, he came to Munich, Germany and continued to work with musicians such as  Embryo, Götz Tangerding, Hannes Beckmann, Titus Waldenfels, Suchredin Chronov or Joe Malinga.

Discography

As leader
 The Black Cat (Whynot, 1975)
 Hot House: Live in Paris Duc de Lombards Vol. 1 (with Larry Porter, Stafford James, Ronnie Burrage)
 New York Calling: Live in Paris Vol. 2 (with Larry Porter, Stafford James, Ronnie Burrage, Tom Nicholas)
 Jazzoetry (with Paulo Cardoso and Tom Nicholas)
 Monty Waters & Titus Waldenfels: Favourite Things
 Monty Waters & Titus Waldenfels: Full Blast (with Jürgen Schneider)
 Monty Waters & L'ubo Samo Quintet: Moonlight in Slovakia (with Titus Waldenfels)
 Embryo : Turn Peace
 Götz Tangerding Trio feat. Sheila Jordan : Jazztracks

As sideman
With Billy Higgins
The Soldier (Red, 1979)
With Joe Lee Wilson
Shout for Trane (1976)
With Sam Rivers
Crystals (1974)
With Ronnie Boykins
The Will Come, Is Now (1975)

External links
Official website
Live in Paris - Duc Des Lombardes Volume 2
Allmusic biography

American jazz singers
American jazz saxophonists
American male saxophonists
American jazz flautists
1938 births
2008 deaths
20th-century American singers
20th-century American saxophonists
20th-century American male musicians
American male jazz musicians
20th-century flautists